Minor Wilson "Mickey" Heath (October 30, 1903 – July 30, 1986) was a professional baseball player. He was a first baseman over parts of two seasons (1931–32) with the Cincinnati Reds. For his career, he compiled a .213 batting average in 160 at-bats, with 18 runs batted in. In addition, in 17 minor league seasons, Heath hit 287 home runs.

He was born in Toledo, Ohio and died in Dallas, Texas at the age of 82. Heath was the father of NFL player Stan Heath.

External links

 

1903 births
1986 deaths
Cincinnati Reds players
Major League Baseball first basemen
Baseball players from Ohio
Birmingham Barons players
Toronto Maple Leafs (International League) players
Hollywood Stars players
Rochester Red Wings players
Columbus Red Birds players
Indianapolis Indians players
Montreal Royals players
Milwaukee Brewers (minor league) managers
Milwaukee Brewers (minor league) players